Eric Theodore Erlandson (born January 9, 1963) is an American musician, guitarist, and writer, primarily known as founding member, songwriter and lead guitarist of alternative rock band Hole from 1989 to 2002. He has also had several musical side projects, including Rodney & the Tube Tops, which he formed with Thurston Moore of Sonic Youth, and RRIICCEE with Vincent Gallo.

While studying creative writing, Erlandson published a book titled Letters to Kurt in 2012, consisting of free-form and stream-of-consciousness poetry.

Early life
Erlandson was born January 9, 1963 in Los Angeles, one of seven children in a Roman Catholic family.  He is of Swedish, German, and Irish descent. Erlandson and his siblings were raised in the Los Angeles community of San Pedro. 

Erlandson studied economics with a minor in marketing at Loyola Marymount University, where his father, Theodore Erlandson, served as dean of the College of Liberal Arts and Sciences, and earned a Bachelor of Science degree. During his college years, he worked for the now-defunct Licorice Pizza record store chain.

In the late-1980s, Erlandson was working as an accountant for Capitol Records, where he managed Paul McCartney's, Tina Turner's, and various other artists' royalties. In 1988, Erlandson traveled Europe for a number of months "trying to decide what he wanted to do with his life."

Career

1989–2002: Hole 

In 1989, Erlandson responded to an advertisement placed by Courtney Love in Recycler, a local classified ad paper. Erlandson describes the band's first rehearsal session, which featured original bassist Lisa Roberts, as:
These two girls show up dressed completely crazy, we set up and they said, "okay, just start playing something." I started playing and they started screaming at the top of their lungs for two or three hours. Crazy lyrics and screaming. I said to myself, "most people would just run away from this really fast." But I heard something in Courtney's voice and lyrics.

Love, Erlandson and Roberts were later joined by drummer Caroline Rue and third guitarist Mike Geisbrecht, and this line-up performed Hole's first live performances. A new line-up, with new bassist Jill Emery and without Geisbrecht, recorded their debut album, Pretty on the Inside, in 1991. After achieving underground success in the United Kingdom, Emery left the band in February and Rue in April 1992. With new members Patty Schemel and Kristen Pfaff, Hole signed a contract with their new label DGC in 1992 and, a year later, began touring and recording for their sophomore and major label debut, Live Through This. The album, ranked by Time magazine as one of the top 100 albums of all time, received unanimous critical acclaim and is Hole's most successful record to date.

During Hole's hiatus in 1996, Erlandson formed a short-lived side project, Rodney & the Tube Tops, with Thurston Moore of Sonic Youth, various other musicians and DJ Rodney Bingenheimer.  The project dissolved shortly after releasing the single "I Hate the '90's". He also co-produced the Sympathy for the Record Industry release "Milk Carton" by The Grown Ups, a raw riot of an album by a group of 14-year-old girls from Santa Monica, California.

Hole released their third studio album, Celebrity Skin, in 1998, with Erlandson co-producing the record. More pop-oriented than their previous albums, the album was a commercial success and was the last material by Hole to feature Erlandson. Auf der Maur left the group in 1999 to pursue other musical projects and on May 22, 2002, Erlandson and Love disbanded Hole through their official website noting that they would "no longer record or tour together".

2003–2008: White Flag and RRIICCEE
Following Hole's disbandment, Erlandson contributed to Melissa Auf der Maur's debut solo album Auf der Maur, playing guitar on the track "Would If I Could". He toured with his friend Bill Bartell's band, White Flag, and wrote, produced and performed two shows with a group including singer/songwriter John Wolfington and drummer Blackie Onassis from Urge Overkill.

In 2007, Erlandson formed an improvisational music project, RRIICCEE, with Corey Lee Granet, and Vincent Gallo. The band toured the United States and Canada between 2007 and 2008, and performed at the Fuji Rock Festival in Japan before its dissolution.

2009–present: Other projects
In 2009, Love announced that her upcoming solo album, Nobody's Daughter, was being released under the name Hole and described the band's reunion, which included Love's guitarist Micko Larkin replacing Erlandson. Auf der Maur was first to respond to the news, describing it as "jeopardis[ing] a real Hole reunion" and Erlandson stated that he and Love "have a contract", which was later revealed to be a contract preventing either from reforming Hole without mutual involvement. In a later interview, just days before the expected release of Hole's Nobody's Daughter, Erlandson explained how "[Courtney's] management convinced me that it was all hot air and that she would never be able to finish her album. Now I'm left in an uncomfortable position." Neither Love nor Erlandson have commented on the reunion further. In 2010, he noted that he has "new musical projects in the works".

In April 2012, Courtney Love joined Erlandson, bassist Melissa Auf der Maur, and drummer Patty Schemel onstage for the first time in 15 years at the after party for the premiere of Schemel's documentary entitled Hit So Hard. The band played two songs that evening, "Miss World" from the band's hit album Live Through This and a cover of The Wipers song "Over the Edge".

In April 2014, Love confirmed that she had been rehearsing new material with Erlandson, Schemel, and Auf der Maur, and that a reunion of the 1994 lineup of the band was being prepared.

In May 2019, Love confirmed that all the members are definitely "talking about it", in reference to regrouping and reforming the band.
In October 2019, Love posted a since-deleted photo of the group together, rehearsing songs in Los Angeles.

Personal life
Erlandson has practiced Buddhism since 1992. During his tenure in Hole in the 1990s, Erlandson was romantically involved with the group's bassist Kristen Pfaff, until her death in June 1994 as well as actress Drew Barrymore. He had also previously dated Courtney Love.

References

1963 births
Living people
Hole (band) members
American alternative rock musicians
American rock guitarists
American male guitarists
Sympathy for the Record Industry artists
American people of German descent
American people of Irish descent
American people of Swedish descent
American Buddhists
Loyola Marymount University alumni
People from San Pedro, Los Angeles
Alternative rock guitarists
Guitarists from Los Angeles
20th-century American guitarists
Rodney & the Tube Tops members